William Joseph Guste Jr. (May 26, 1922 – July 24, 2013) was an American attorney and politician from the state of Louisiana. He was Attorney General of Louisiana from 1972 to 1992.

References

1922 births
2013 deaths
Democratic Party Louisiana state senators
Louisiana Attorneys General
American restaurateurs
Politicians from New Orleans
Jesuit High School (New Orleans) alumni
Loyola University New Orleans alumni
Loyola University New Orleans College of Law alumni
1976 United States presidential electors
United States Army officers
United States Army personnel of World War II
Activists for African-American civil rights
Lawyers from New Orleans
20th-century American lawyers